Marcelo Costa Resende Siqueira  (born January 27, 1987 in Porto Alegre) is a Brazilian football player, last played for Agremiação Sportiva Arapiraquense.

External links
websoccerclub.com Profile

1987 births
Living people
Brazilian footballers
Brazilian expatriate footballers
Cypriot First Division players
Grêmio Foot-Ball Porto Alegrense players
AEK Larnaca FC players
Ethnikos Achna FC players
Agremiação Sportiva Arapiraquense players
Association football defenders
Expatriate footballers in Cyprus
Footballers from Porto Alegre